Pitcoudie is a housing area in North Glenrothes in the Kingdom of Fife, Scotland - comprising 396 terraced and semi-detached houses. Traditionally, a pitcoudie was a donkey, mule or work-horse which ferried coal and slag from the coal mines - spending most of its life underground. The area of Pitcoudie today exists on what was once an extensive range of mining-shafts and pits. There is also a primary school in the area, along with Pitteuchar West primary school in the south of Glenrothes, it is one of just two primary schools in Glenrothes to be open-planned.

Populated places in Fife
Glenrothes